Gustav Berglund (born 8 January 2001) is a Swedish ice hockey defenceman currently playing for Mora IK of the HockeyAllsvenskan (Allsv). Berglund was drafted 177th overall by the Detroit Red Wings in the 2019 NHL Entry Draft.

Playing career
Berglund made his professional debut for Frölunda HC of the Swedish Hockey League (SHL) during the 2019–20 season, where he appeared in eight games.

On 6 May 2021, Berglund left the Frölunda HC organization, signing a one-year contract to continue in the Allsvenskan with Mora IK.

International play
Berglund represented Sweden at the 2021 World Junior Ice Hockey Championships.

Career statistics

Regular season and playoffs

International

References

External links
 

2001 births
Living people
Detroit Red Wings draft picks
Frölunda HC players
People from Huskvarna
Swedish ice hockey defencemen
VIK Västerås HK players
Sportspeople from Jönköping County